Blaque Out! is the second album by American trio Blaque. The album was shelved in the U.S. but was released in Japan before finally being released in the United States in 2007 as an iTunes download. The lead single, "Can't Get It Back" was released on October 29, 2001, and peaked at number 47 on Billboard R&B single sales chart. 

Group member Natina Reed said that Blaque Out! was both the strongest of the group's three albums and also her personal favorite album.

Track listing

1 After the 2007 iTunes version of the album disappeared from online catalogs in 2008, the album resurfaced via iTunes in 2011 with "He Said She Said" excluded from the album; the track was later released separated as a single on 9 August 2008, renamed "He Say, She Say".

Release history

References

2001 albums
Albums produced by Dallas Austin
Albums produced by Salaam Remi
Blaque albums